The 2008 Recopa Sul-Brasileira was the 2nd staging of this Brazilian football knockout competition. All matches of the competition were played at Estádio Augusto Bauer, Brusque, Santa Catarina. Four clubs participated of the competition: Pelotas, of Rio Grande do Sul (champion of Copa FGF), Londrina of Paraná (champion of Copa Paraná), Atlético Sorocaba of São Paulo (champion of Copa Paulista de Futebol), and Brusque of Santa Catarina (champion of Copa Santa Catarina).

Prize money
The winner of the competition was awarded a prize money amount of R$30,000, and the runner-up was awarded a prize money amount of R$10,000.

Competition format
The competition is a one legged knockout tournament played in two stages, semifinals and the final.

Competition stages

Semifinals

Final

Champion

Top goalscorers

References

External links
 Recopa Sul-Brasileira 2008 at RSSSF

2008 Recopa Sul-Brasileira
2008 Brazilian football competitions
2008 domestic association football cups